Raimondo Ricci Bitti (born 24 June 1956) is a former professional tennis player.

Ricci Bitti, a Faenza native, won back to back Universiade silver medals for men's doubles in 1981 and 1983. During his professional career he made four doubles main draw appearances at the Bologna Indoor.

His elder brother is sports administrator Francesco Ricci Bitti.

References

External links
 
 

1956 births
Living people
Italian male tennis players
People from Faenza
Sportspeople from the Province of Ravenna
Universiade medalists in tennis
Universiade silver medalists for Italy
Medalists at the 1981 Summer Universiade
Medalists at the 1983 Summer Universiade
20th-century Italian people